In engineering, the Moody chart or Moody diagram (also Stanton diagram) is a graph in non-dimensional form that relates the Darcy–Weisbach friction factor fD, Reynolds number Re, and surface roughness for fully developed flow in a circular pipe. It can be used to predict pressure drop or flow rate down such a pipe.

History 
In 1944, Lewis Ferry Moody plotted the Darcy–Weisbach friction factor against Reynolds number Re for various values of relative roughness ε / D.
This chart became commonly known as the Moody chart or Moody diagram. 
It adapts the work of Hunter Rouse
but uses the more practical choice of coordinates employed by R. J. S. Pigott, whose work was based upon an analysis of some 10,000 experiments from various sources.
Measurements of fluid flow in artificially roughened pipes by J. Nikuradse were at the time too recent to include in Pigott's chart.

The chart's purpose was to provide a graphical representation of the function of C. F. Colebrook in collaboration with C. M. White, which provided a practical form of transition curve to bridge the transition zone between smooth and rough pipes, the region of incomplete turbulence.

Description
Moody's team used the available data (including that of Nikuradse) to show that fluid flow in rough pipes could be described by four dimensionless quantities: Reynolds number, pressure loss coefficient, diameter ratio of the pipe and the relative roughness of the pipe.  They then produced a single plot which showed that all of these collapsed onto a series of lines, now known as the Moody chart. This dimensionless chart is used to work out pressure drop,  (Pa) (or head loss, (m)) and flow rate through pipes. Head loss can be calculated using the Darcy–Weisbach equation in which the Darcy friction factor  appears :

Pressure drop can then be evaluated as:

or directly from

The Moody chart can be divided into two regimes of flow: laminar and turbulent. For the laminar flow regime (< ~3000), roughness has no discernible effect, and the Darcy–Weisbach friction factor was determined analytically by Poiseuille:

For the turbulent flow regime, the relationship between the friction factor  the Reynolds number Re,  and the relative roughness is more complex. One model for this relationship is the Colebrook equation (which is an implicit equation in ):

Fanning friction factor 

This formula must not be confused with the Fanning equation, using the Fanning friction factor , equal to one fourth the Darcy-Weisbach friction factor . Here the pressure drop is:

References

See also  
Friction loss
Darcy friction factor formulae

Fluid dynamics
Hydraulics
Piping